Nuova Banca means new bank, may refer to the following Italian banks:
 Nuova Banca dell'Etruria e del Lazio, a defunct subsidiary of UBI Banca
 Nuova Banca delle Marche, a defunct subsidiary of UBI Banca
 Nuova Banca Mediterranea, a defunct subsidiary of Banca Popolare di Bari
 Nuova Banca del Monte Sant'Agata, former name of Credito Siciliano

See also
 Nuovo Banco Ambrosiano, predecessor of Intesa Sanpaolo
 Banca Nuova, an Italian bank
 Banca della Nuova Terra, an Italian bank, a wholly owned subsidiary of Banca Popolare di Sondrio